Neolamprologus leloupi is a species of cichlid endemic to Lake Tanganyika.  This species reaches a length of  TL.  It can also be found in the aquarium trade. The specific name honours the malacologist Eugène Leloup (1902-1981), chief of the Belgian Hydrobiological Mission to Lake Tanganyika in 1946–1947, the type being collected during this expedition.

References

leloupi
Taxa named by Max Poll
Fish described in 1948
Taxonomy articles created by Polbot

de:Tanganjika-Goldcichlide